The Voice UK is a British television music competition to find new singing talent. The seventh series began airing on 6 January 2018 and concluded on 7 April 2018. It was presented by Emma Willis on ITV. will.i.am, Jennifer Hudson and Sir Tom Jones return for their seventh, second and sixth series, respectively, with Olly Murs replacing Gavin Rossdale as a new coach for the series. Previous runner-up Jamie Miller replaced Cel Spellman as the presenter of companion show, The V Room, broadcast through the ITV Hub.

Coaches

On 6 March 2017, it was announced that will.i.am would be returning as a coach on the show for his seventh series, with ITV stating that they were in "all parties" to have Sir Tom Jones to return as a coach as well. After much speculation regarding his future on the programme, on 6 August 2017, Gavin Rossdale announced his departure from the programme, after just one series as a coach. Following this announcement, Danny Jones became the favourite to replace Rossdale, after impressing show producers in his performance on the junior spin-off programme The Voice UK, though former coach Ricky Wilson was also in the running, as he previously stated that the door would be left open for him to return to the show after his first departure in 2016. On 11 October 2017, Olly Murs was confirmed as Rossdale's replacement, after being linked with the position for many weeks, along with the news that Jennifer Hudson would be returning for her second series as a coach. Emma Willis will return for her second series as solo presenter, her fifth overall, with Jamie Miller replacing Cel Spellman as the presenter of companion show The V Room.

On 8 February 2018, it was announced that the coaches will have Guest Mentors to help them choose their acts in the Knockout stages and they are as follows: Craig David will help Olly Murs, Apl.de.ap and Taboo will help will.i.am, Kylie Minogue will help Sir Tom Jones and Mo Adeniran and Leona Lewis will help Jennifer Hudson.

It was announced on 12 March 2018, Vick Hope would be replacing Jamie Miller as the backstage presenter.

Promotion
The first teaser trailer for the seventh series was released in December 2017, featuring coaches will.i.am, Hudson, Jones and Murs. The coaches were also interviewed by The V Room presenter Miller, at the red carpet for the blind auditions.

Teams
Colour key:
  Winner
  Runner-up
  Third place
  Fourth place 
  Eliminated in the Semi-Final
  Eliminated in the Knockouts
  Artist was stolen by another coach at the Battles
  Eliminated in the Battles

Blind auditions
On 14 December 2017, it was announced by ITV that the seventh series would begin broadcasting on 6 January 2018.

Colour key

Episode 1 (6 January)
The series premiere aired from 8.00pm until 9.35pm.

Group performance: The Voice UK coaches – "Feeling Good"

Episode 2 (13 January)
This episode aired from 8.00pm until 9.30pm.
 Performance: between Sir Tom Jones & Jennifer Hudson – "Whole Lotta Shakin' Goin' On"

Episode 3 (20 January)
This episode aired from 8.00pm until 9.30pm.
 Performance: from  Olly Murs – "Dance with Me Tonight"

Episode 4 (27 January)
This episode aired from 8.00pm until 9.30pm.

Episode 5 (3 February)
This episode aired from 8.00pm until 9.30pm.

Episode 6 (10 February)
This episode aired from 8.15pm until 9.45pm.

Episode 7 (17 February)
This episode aired from 8.00pm until 9.30pm.

Battle rounds
Filming for the battles began in December 2017 at dock10, MediaCityUK, following the taping of the blind auditions. Each coach has only one steal. The first part of the battle rounds will be broadcast on 24 February 2018.

Colour key

Knockouts
Filming for the show was on 10–11 March 2018 at Elstree Studios (Shenley Road). The first part of the battle rounds will be broadcast on 17 March 2018. In this round the mentors will help at the piano rehearsals.

Colour key:

Live shows
The live shows began on 31 March 2018.

Results summary
Team’s colour key 
 Team Will
 Team JHud
 Team Tom
 Team Olly

Result's colour key
 Artist received the fewest votes and was eliminated 
 Artist won the competition

Week 1: Semi-final (31 March)
This episode aired from 8.30pm to 10:00pm.

Musical guest: Mo Jamil ("That Feeling")

Week 2: Final (7 April)
This episode will air from 8:30pm to 10:10pm.

Group performance: The Voice UK coaches – "Come Together"

Reception

Ratings
Official ratings are taken from BARB.

References

External links
 Official website

Series 07
2018 British television seasons